The Kroger Classic was a golf tournament on the Champions Tour from 1990 to 2004. It was played in Mason, Ohio at the Golf Center at Kings Island (1990–2001) and Maineville, Ohio at the TPC at River's Bend (2002–2004). 

The purse for the 2004 tournament was US$1,500,000, with $225,000 going to the winner. The tournament was founded in 1990 as the Kroger Senior Classic.

Winners
2004 Bruce Summerhays
2003 Gil Morgan

Kroger Senior Classic
2002 Bob Gilder
2001 Jim Thorpe
2000 Hubert Green
1999 Gil Morgan
1998 Hugh Baiocchi
1997 Jay Sigel
1996 Isao Aoki
1995 Mike Hill
1994 Jim Colbert
1993 Simon Hobday
1992 Gibby Gilbert
1991 Al Geiberger
1990 Jim Dent

Source:

References

Former PGA Tour Champions events
Golf in Ohio
Warren County, Ohio
Recurring sporting events established in 1990
Recurring sporting events disestablished in 2004
1990 establishments in Ohio
2004 disestablishments in Ohio